Metro  is a 2016 Indian Tamil-language action crime film directed by Anandakrishnan, in his second venture. The film features Shirish, Bobby Simha and Sendrayan in the lead roles. The film is based on the theme of chain snatching in the city of Chennai. Shirish makes his Tamil debut with this film. The film was released on 24 June 2016. The film was dubbed and released in Telugu under the same title in 2017.

Plot
Arivazhagan aka Arivu and his friend Kumar lock up and torture an unknown man in front of a camera filming the whole incident.

Flashback: Arivu is a writer for a press and the eldest son of a retired police head constable and his wife. He has a brother named Mathiyazhagan aka Mathi, who is a first-year engineering student. Arivu's middle-class family life is however happy with his friend Kumar mingling as one of the family. The problem begins when Mathi, who is pressured by his girlfriend to get a bike, persuades his family to get him a bike. 

Though hesitant at first, they agree to get him a bike of his choice. However, a delay in getting his bike and seeing his classmate Ganesh spending casually makes him curious to know what he does for money. Ganesh introduces Mathi to the heinous crime of chain snatching and also introduces Guna, who is heading a gang of young college-going chain snatchers. Mathi joins the gang and starts to earn through chain snatching and get all the things he wants. 

Mathi decides to do these crimes alone without having to give Guna any commission. Though hesitant at first, the others join him when 2 of the boys get caught by police and Guna does not come to their aid. Mathi goes back to his house to get a chain recently snatched by him, only to find his mother with the chain and all the other gadgets he owns without his parents's knowledge. 

An argument begins, and Mathi pushes his mother to death. When Arivu and his father come home to realize their mother's death, Kumar vows to avenge the loss even when Arivu joins in. During a police investigation, Arivu and Kumar track down a house breaker and nab him to an unknown location 

Present: Arivu calls the police to hand over the house breaker and runs away with the bag. He takes the bag with 23 kgs of stolen gold chains to a black market buyer. At that place, he finds his mother's chain, which leads him to the chain snatchers. Arivu leaves the place, not before killing all the men in there. 

Meanwhile, Mathi injects Guna with a drug that makes him insane and loses his senses. Arivu goes to Guna's place and finds out the next plan of the snatchers. He leaves with Kumar to the place, and a fight ensues where Arivu and Kumar manage to kill 3-4 men. Unknown that the 2 men are his brother and friend, Mathi removes his helmet and reveals his face. 

Shocked in despair, Arivu and Kumar removes their helmet too, which surprises Mathi. When Mathi pleads with Arivu to spare him, Arivu ignores and kills him. The next day, Arivu and Kumar reveal the truth to Arivu's father and surrenders to the police.

Cast
 Shirish as Arivazhagan
 Bobby Simha as Guna
 Sendrayan as Kumar
 Sathya as Mathiyazhagan
 Maya as Ramya
 A. L. Raja as Arivu and Mathi's father
 Thulasi as Arivu and Mathi's mother
 Sai Priyanka Ruth as Mathi's lover
 Nishanth as Ganesh
 Sakthivel as ACP
 Rajkumar as Minnal Sekar
 Durai as SI
 Namo Narayana as Agent Chokkalingam
 E. Ramdoss as Office Manager
 Yogi Babu as a man in the subway

Production
Bobby Simha agreed to work on the film as the antagonist in early 2015, despite having begun to work on bigger budget films and as the lead actor in other projects. In September 2015, the film's music composer Johan Shevanesh, travelled the Germany to work on the film's sound mixing. Director Anandakrishnan said that the film is based on chain snatching people.

Soundtrack
In January 2016, actor Karthi launched a single track for the film at the request of the producers.

Release
The film was given an "A" certificate by the Indian Censor Board due to its violent content, the sequences were demanded to be cut short, but the director Anandakrishnan did not agree to, he believed that the content of the story is very strong so therefore he wants to showcase the true Incidents. The Central Board of Film Certification (CBFC) of Tamil Nadu banned the movie, therefore the director sent the movie for the Revising committee. Due to the conflict, the film's release got further delayed. After arriving at an agreement —the film was not cut and retained its "A" Certificate— the release date was fixed as 24 June 2016.

References

External links
 

2016 films
2010s Tamil-language films
2016 crime action films
Indian crime action films
Tamil films remade in other languages